Masakat ( or မာစကပ်) is a traditional Burmese snack or mont. The snack is essentially a translucent pudding cooked with cashew nuts.

Masakat originates in Mandalay, and its origins are attributed to an Indian dessert of the same name. The term masakat is likely cognate with Acehnese meuseukat, a confection popular in Aceh, Indonesia. The dessert is likened to Karachi halwa, and is made with corn starch, sugar, butter, cardamom seeds, and cashew nuts.

References

Burmese cuisine